Susan Lisa Jackson (known as Lisa Jackson; born 1952) is a best-selling American author of over 75 romance novels and romantic suspense novels.

Biography
Before she became a nationally-bestselling author, Jackson was a struggling mother who wrote novels with the hope that someone would pay her for them. Currently, her books appear on The New York Times, the USA Today, and the Publishers Weekly national bestseller lists. Jackson is the author of more than 85 novels, including Afraid to Die, Tell Me, You Don't Want to Know, Running Scared, Without Mercy, Malice, and Shiver.  She is also the co-author of the Colony Series, co-written with her sister, Nancy Bush. There are over 20 million copies of Jackson's books in print in twenty languages. She also writes under the pen name, "Susan Lynn Crose".

Selected works

New Orleans series with Detectives Rick Bentz and Reuben Montoya
Hot Blooded (May 2001)
Cold Blooded (June 2002)
Shiver (March 2007)
Absolute Fear (March 2008)
Lost Souls (February 2009)
Malice (June 2010)
Devious (February 2012)
 Never Die Alone (July 2015)

To Die series
Left to Die (July 2008)
Chosen to Die (July 2009)
Born to Die (August 2011)
Afraid to Die (June 2012)
Ready to Die (August 2013)
Deserves to Die (July 2014)
Expecting to Die (February 2017)
Willing to Die (April 2019)

Wicked series
Written with Nancy Bush
Wicked Game (February 2009)
Wicked Lies (June 2011)
Something Wicked (June 2013)
Wicked Ways (November 2014)

Savannah series
The Night Before (March 2003)
The Morning After (March 2004)
Tell Me (July 2013)
The Third Grave (July 2021)

San Francisco Series with the Cahill Family and Detective Anthony Paterno
If She Only Knew (October 2000)
Almost Dead (August 2007)
You Betrayed Me (July 2020)

Northwest Series
Deep Freeze (February 2005)
Fatal Burn (March 2006)
After She's Gone (August 2016)

Maverick series
He's a Bad Boy (1993)
He's Just a Cowboy (1993)
He's the Rich Boy (1993)
He's My Soldier Boy (1994)

Dark Jewels series
 Dark Ruby (1998)
 Dark Emerald (1999)
 Dark Sapphire (2000)
 Dark Ruby / Dark Sapphire (omnibus) (2005)

Forever Family series
A Family Kind of Girl (1999)
A Family Kind of Guy (1999)
A Family Kind of Wedding (1999)

McCaffertys series
Thorne (2000)
Matt (2001)
Slade (2002)
Best-Kept Lies (2004)
Randi (2007)

Medieval Trilogy
Impostress (2003)
Temptress (2004)
Sorceress (2007)

Novels
A Twist of Fate (1983)
Dark Side of the Moon (1984)
Gypsy Wind (1984)
Pirate's Gold (1984)
Shadow of Time (1984)
Devil's Gambit (1985)
Dangerous Precedent (1985)
Tears of Pride (1985)
Innocent by Association (1985)
Midnight Sun (1985)
Yesterday's Lies (1986)
Zachary's Law (1986)
Mystic (1986)
One Man's Love (1986)
Renegade Son (1987)
Snowbound (1987)
Summer Rain (1987)
Hurricane Force (1988)
In Honor's Shadow (1988)
Aftermath (1989)
Tender Trap (1989)
His Bride to Be (1990)
With No Regrets (1990)
Double Exposure (1990)
Mystery Man (1991)
Obsession (1991)
Million Dollar Baby (1992)
Sail Away (1992)
A Husband to Remember (1993)
Treasures (1994) (also known as See How She Dies)
Intimacies (1995)
Wishes (1995)
Whispers (1996)
The Millionaire and the Cowgirl (1996)
New Year's Daddy (1996)
Twice Kissed (1998)
Unspoken (1999)
Lone Stallion's Lady (2000)
Wild and Wicked (2002)
See How She Dies (2004)
Final Scream (2005)
Twice Kissed (2006)
Missing (2008)
Chosen to Die (2009)
Running Scared (2010)
Sweet Revenge (2010)
Without Mercy (2010)
You Don't Want To Know (2012)
Confessions (2012)
Close to Home (2014)
You Will Pay (2017)

Omnibus
1993 Silhouette Christmas Stories (1993)
Treasures / Gifts of the Heart (1994)
Silhouette Christmas Stories (1994)
The Parent Trap (1996) (with Kasey Michaels and Dallas Schulze)
Tis the Season (1997) (with Elaine Coffman, Kat Martin and Katherine Sutcliffe)
A Fortune's Children Christmas (1999) (with Barbara Boswell and Linda Turner)
Santa Baby (2002) (with Kylie Adams, Elaine Coffman and Lisa Plumley)
Randi / Beyond Control (2004) (with Bronwyn Jameson)
Deck the Halls (2004) (with Marcia Evanick, Virginia Henley, Fern Michaels and Linda Lael Miller)
Kiss Me Again: Stranger in Her Bed / Marrying Kind / Satisfy Me / Brass Ring (2005) (with Suzanne Forster, Lori Foster and Debbie Macomber)
Strangers: Mystery Man (2005)
Best-Kept Lies / Wild in the Moment (2005) (with Jennifer Greene)
Billionaire's Proposition / Taking Care of Business (2006) (with Leanne Banks)
Most Likely to Die (2007) (with Beverly Barton and Wendy Corsi Staub)
Secrets: Pirate's Gold / Dark Side Of The Moon (2007)

See also
List of romantic novelists
List of thriller writers

External links
Lisa Jackson's Official Website
Lisa Jackson's Facebook Fanpage
Lisa Jackson's Myspace page
Lisa Jackson's Twitter Page
Lisa Jackson's Webpage in Fantastic Fiction's Website

20th-century American novelists
21st-century American novelists
American romantic fiction writers
RITA Award winners
1952 births
Living people
Oregon State University alumni
American women novelists
Women romantic fiction writers
Women mystery writers
20th-century American women writers
21st-century American women writers